Mastacembelus platysoma is a species of fish, a spiny eel in the family Mastacembelidae. It is found in Lake Tanganyika which is bordered by Burundi, the Democratic Republic of the Congo, Tanzania and Zambia. The IUCN has listed it as being of "Least Concern".

Description
Like other members of its genus, Mastacembelus platysoma is an elongated, eel-like fish and has a long snout with a pair of tubulated nostrils. It has a series of widely spaced dorsal spines on its back and it has 71 vertebrae.

Distribution and habitat
Mastacembelus platysoma is endemic to Lake Tanganyika and occurs nowhere else.

Ecology
Mastacembelus platysoma is one of fourteen species of spiny eel which live in Lake Tanganyika. These fish have radiated from a common ancestor, each one developing specialist adaptations fitting it for a different ecological niche in the lake. In this way, competition between the species is avoided as each has a different diet and occupies a slightly different microhabitat.

Status
The IUCN has listed Mastacembelus platysoma as being of "Least Concern" as it has a wide distribution in the lake and no major threats have been identified.

References

platysoma
Fish of Lake Tanganyika
Fish described in 1962
Taxa named by Hubert Matthes
Taxa named by Max Poll
Taxonomy articles created by Polbot